Ingeborg Ella Pfüller (born 1 January 1932) was a track and field athlete from Argentina who competed in the discus throw and shot put. She represented her native country at the 1952 Summer Olympics and won the gold medal in the women's discus throw event at the 1955 Pan American Games in Mexico City, Mexico. She also won the discus throw at the South American Championships in 1961 and 1963.

References

External links
 

1932 births
Possibly living people
Argentine female shot putters
Argentine female discus throwers
Athletes (track and field) at the 1951 Pan American Games
Athletes (track and field) at the 1952 Summer Olympics
Athletes (track and field) at the 1955 Pan American Games
Athletes (track and field) at the 1963 Pan American Games
Olympic athletes of Argentina
Argentine people of German descent
Pan American Games gold medalists for Argentina
Pan American Games silver medalists for Argentina
Pan American Games bronze medalists for Argentina
Pan American Games medalists in athletics (track and field)
Medalists at the 1951 Pan American Games
Medalists at the 1955 Pan American Games
Medalists at the 1963 Pan American Games
20th-century Argentine women